"I Love You and Kiss Me" is the fifth single released by Japanese rock band, The Teenage Kissers, and the second from their album, Virgin Field. The single was released digitally on June 6, 2014. The song was previously included as a bonus track on the special edition of the single "Ghost Bitch". The song was used as the opening song for the show Rank Kingdom in June and July 2014.

Track listing

Personnel
Nana Kitade – Vocals, lyrics
Hideo Nekota – Bass, music
Mai Koike – Drums
Tsubasa Nakada – Guitar

References

External links
The Teenage Kissers Official Site

Songs about kissing
2014 singles
Nana Kitade songs
Songs written by Nana Kitade
2014 songs